Adolph Saurer AG was a Swiss manufacturer of embroidery and textile machines, trucks and buses under the Saurer and Berna (beginning in 1929) brand names.  Based in Arbon, Switzerland, the firm was active between 1903 and 1982. Their vehicles were widely used across mainland Europe, particularly in the interwar period.

History

In 1853 Franz Saurer (1806–1882) from Veringenstadt, Germany established an iron foundry for household goods near the Swiss town of Sankt Gallen. Eastern Switzerland was a center for both embroidery and embroidery machine development.

About 1850 Franz Rittmeyer built the first practical, satin stitch embroidery machine, known as the Handstickmaschine. Several Swiss companies began building and improving these machines, and their heyday lasted from roughly 1865 until the end of the century. Two of Franz Saurer's sons – Anton and Adolf - were aware of this invention, saw an opportunity, and began building hand embroidery machines in their father's foundry in about 1869. By 1873 F. Saurer & Söhne was the leader among the Swiss competitors in terms of sales and total machines built. By 1883 Saurer's production peaked at 796 machines per year. They had produced a total of 5,530 machines to date.

Saxony Germany was also a center for embroidery and machine development. By the 1890s, German companies were Saurer's strongest competition. By the late 1870s a new, faster type of machine was invented. The (bobbin) shuttle, or schiffli machine adapted the lock stitch from the sewing machine. A German company added a Jacquard punch card reader, and thus fully automated the process. Competition motivated engineers at Saurer to develop their own Jacquard card reader, improve the stitch rate, and increase the machine's width, i.e. total number of needles and throughput. In 1905 Saurer matched the competing machine's width at ten meters.  In 1913 it increased the width to 15 meters.

The embroidery industry experienced many ups and downs due to fashion, trade policies and world wars. Saurer diversified into petrol and diesel engines, and then trucks to reduce its exposure to this volatility. However, Saurer continued to innovate and is still a leader in schiffli embroidery machines.

In 1896 the eldest surviving son Adolph Saurer (1841–1920) took over the company.  He and his son Hippolyt (1878–1936) developed the enterprise as a joint-stock company.  Hippolyt Saurer initiated the production of a phaeton body automobile run by a one-cylinder opposed-piston engine. In 1902 a first four-cylinder T-head engine model with touring car and sedan chassis was built.

From 1903 onwards Saurer concentrated on the production of commercial vehicles which soon gained a good reputation. The company ran subsidiary companies in Austria (1906–1959, in the end taken over by Steyr-Daimler-Puch), France (1910–1956, taken over by Unic), the United Kingdom (1927–1931, taken over by Armstrong Whitworth as Armstrong-Saurer), and in Germany (1915–1918, taken over by MAN). In Italy, the Officine Meccaniche (OM) manufacturer was for many years licensee of Saurer engines and other mechanical units, which they used in their own ranges of trucks and buses. In Poland the state-owned Państwowe Zakłady Inżynieryjne produced license-built Saurer engines (powering, among others, the 7TP and 9TP tanks) and coach chassis used in the Zawrat bus.

In the United States, the Saurer Motor Truck Company, headed by C.P. Coleman, had the rights to manufacture and sell heavy trucks under the Saurer brand name at its plant in Plainfield, New Jersey (which commenced operations in November 1911). On September 23, 1911, the Saurer Motor Truck Company merged with the Mack Brothers Motor Car Company of Allentown, Pennsylvania, headed by J. M. Mack, to form the International Motor Truck Company (IMTC). IMTC would continue to make and sell trucks using the Saurer name until 1918. In 1922 IMTC would become Mack Trucks, Inc.

Saurer trucks were developed along the years into four basic ranges:
A-type (1918)
B-type (1926)
C-type (1934)
D-type (1959)

It was the B-type that established Saurer's international reputation as a builder of long-lasting trucks.

In 1929 Saurer acquired its Swiss rival, Motorwagenfabrik Berna AG of Olten, but the Berna name was allowed to continue, badging the very same Saurer models.

From 1932 on, trolleybuses were a very significant segment of Saurer production. Typically Saurer, or Berna, trolleybuses featured Brown, Boveri & Cie or Société Anonyme des Ateliers de Sécheron (SAAS) electric equipment and Carrosserie Hess bodies. Saurer trolleybuses operated in most of Central Europe countries, and still do in several of them.

In World War 2 a restructured type BT 4500 and 5 BHw of Saurer trucks were used to gas people in the Nazi Chełmno extermination camp. Extermination vans were adapted, when they went in for repair, to carry the optimum number of people who could be gassed in the time it took to drive them from Chelmno to the woods where they were disposed of in ovens. There was concern about the strain on the front axle if too many people were loaded to be gassed, but as piles of bodies were always closest to the doors there was no strain on the front axle.

In 1951 Saurer and its Italian licensee, OM, reached an agreement by which Saurer would market in Switzerland OM's light and medium-weight trucks and buses, using Saurer-OM and Berna-OM badges. This was successful and lasted until Saurer closure.

Aero engines

Saurer began licensed manufacture of aero engines in 1917. They also began developing their own designs, and built two prototypes of a V12 design in 1918.

The FLB series, developed from the 1930s to the 1940s, were based on the principles of the Junkers Jumo 205. Like the Jumo they were two-stroke diesels with two crank shafts and two pistons per combustion chamber. However the cylinders were bent into a V shape, allowing them to be doubled up on each crank shaft to create a compact diamond arrangement. The design was also able to run on petrol, still with fuel injection and a small test engine was run in both modes. The FLB 1000 had three banks giving a design output of 1,000 hp and was briefly bench-tested using petrol. However the project was dropped before it could be run on diesel.

The FLB project was dropped to make room for an urgent requirement to develop the Hispano-Suiza 12Y-51 V-12, a conventional four-stroke petrol engine which was no longer available. Saurer developed it as the YS-2, which entered limited production. It was fitted to the EKW C-3604 and Doflug D-3802. The further developed YS-3 flew in the prototype Doflug D-3803.

NAW
Declining sales in the early 1980s saw the two leading Swiss truck makers, Saurer and FBW (Franz Brozincevic & Cie of Wetzikon, Switzerland), forming a joint organization called Nutzfahrzeuggesellschaft Arbon & Wetzikon, proceeding with motorbus and trolleybus production under the NAW brand, while the last Saurer-badged truck sold in the open market was delivered in 1983. Four years later, in 1987, a model 10DM supplied to the Swiss Army meant the very last Saurer truck produced in history.

In 1982 Daimler-Benz had acquired a major shareholding in NAW and soon took full control; and in a short time dropped Saurer, Berna and FBW brands, while using NAW premises to assemble heavy haulage versions of Mercedes-Benz trucks. Eventually NAW went into liquidation in early 2003.

Last remain of the Saurer automotive activity in Arbon is the present FPT Industrial S.p.A. engine research center, that up to 1990 had been the Saurer Motorenforschung Research & Development Centre.

The textile and automotive spin-offs
In 1995, Ernst Thomke, reputed Swiss Manager, took over the leadership of Saurer AG in Arbon as chairman of the board. To restructure this conglomerate, he had previously abandoned his position with its then major shareholder: BB Industrie Holding AG (22%). The previous major shareholder, Tito Tettamanti, of the conglomerate, founded in 1853, specialized in textile machinery and "propulsion technology", had acquired the main competitor in each field, Schlafhorst, with a large manufacturing capacity excess, and Ghidela.

Thomke led actively Saurer AG until 1996, when he retired to the direction of the Board until 1999. In his years he promulgated transparency at all levels, flexible working hours, optimized the production and refined accounting systems. In 1996, the group Saurer AG went back into financial results showing profits.  More than half of the revenues originating from Schlafhorst, upon its positive restructuring.

Oerlikon Textile

Since 2007, the conglomerate Saurer AG, which meanwhile had reached a worldwide leading status in textile machinery, has been integrated into the Oerlikon Corporation.

Oerlikon-Saurer Textile is a manufacturer of systems for spinning, texturizing, twisting and embroidery.

Oerlikon-Saurer "Graziano Trasmissioni" 
Also since 2007, the remaining Saurer AG automative part,  "Graziano Trasmissioni", a manufacturer of gear, gear groups and complete transmission systems for agricultural, earth moving and special vehicles as well as for four wheel drive passenger cars and luxury sport cars has also been integrated into the Oerlikon Corporation.

Models

Buses 
 Saurer 2A
 Type B:
 2BHP, 3BHP, 3BHPL (1925)
 Saurer AD
 Type C:
 Saurer Hess 1C (1935)
 Saurer Hess 2C 
 Saurer 3C-H (1937)
 Saurer 4H
 Saurer 6H (1946)
 Saurer 4ZP (1946)
 Saurer S4C (1948)
 Saurer 3CT-1DA (1949)
 Saurer 2H Reisewagen (1952)
 Saurer N2C Alpenwagen II (1954)
 Saurer L4C Alpenwagen IIIa (1953)
 Type D:
 Saurer 3DUR 
 Saurer 3DUX Alpenwagen (1955)
 Saurer 5DUP 
 Saurer 3DUK-50 (1968-1973)
 Saurer 5 DUK
 Saurer RH (1978)
 Saurer RH 525-23 Postkurswagen Type IV (1978)
 Saurer RH 580-25 (1980)
 Saurer 5K (1981)
 Saurer SLK

Trolleybus 
 Saurer 411LM
 Saurer 415
 Saurer GT 560
 GT 560 640-25

Military Vehicles
Saurer 4K 4FA
Saurer MH4
Saurer M6
Nahkampfkanone 1
Nahkampfkanone 2
Saurer 2DM
Saurer 10DM
Saurer Tartaruga

Saurer F006

The Saurer F006 (also known as Saurer 288) and F007 were, apart from the Swiss Army cross-country trucks known as the (6-ton) Saurer 6DM and the (10-ton) Saurer 10DM, the last vehicle designs of the company. In the late 1970s the F006 design from Saurer in Arbon, Switzerland was intended as a successor to the Jeep for the Swiss Army. In addition, it was hoped that the vehicle would also be purchased by fire departments as well as become work vehicles for community structures, such as road maintenance operations, forest rangers, electric and water utilities, etc. Selling to private users (like the Mercedes G) was not addressed, but it would have been likely.  The reason was that Monteverdi, the luxury car manufacturer, had put on display at the Geneva Motor Show 1979 the civilian version of the Saurer F006 Military vehicle which they called the 260Z.  This was the 230th based on the Military design. The 260Z was not produced, however they created three prototypes, which are listed in the Monteverdi Museum in Binningen.  While Monteverdi did not use the Saurer chassis they did produce two versions of a luxury SUV vehicle called the Safari/Sahara based on the International Harvester Scout vehicle lending credence to the idea that had the F006 been in production, a civilian version would have emerged.

Technology: It is the Saurer F006 turned into an off-road passenger vehicle with four-wheel drive. The concept was adopted by the automaker Monteverdi, improved by Berna engineering company of Olten, Switzerland. Saurer took over the production. The axles are from IHC Scout (Jeep I scout from International Harvester). The vehicle had a plastic body made of polyester. For power the drive-train was a 6-cylinder petrol engine from Volvo with an automatic transmission. Maximum speed was 100 km/h. Overall styling contrasted to the Mercedes G and Puch 230GE joint venture vehicle with the front turn signals mounted conventionally on the front of the vehicle (and not on the hood). The equipment installed in the front bumper parking lights can be turned by flicking the "Tarnlicht" switch (a multipurpose military switch for light dimming). The basic vehicle has a fixed open back cab. The loading / passenger seats are closed with a fast mountable / demountable plastic sheet at the rear including a military holder for a gas canister; a fixed structure is provided for use in case of fire.

Saurer in 1980 introduced the F006 and in 1982 it was tested by the War Technical Department of the Swiss Army which appreciated the off-road capability. However, the Puch 230GE was procured instead. Failure to secure the army production order meant that production of the vehicle for other potential users was not economically viable. In the end only the 24 prototypes were built, one of which remained in service until 1988, and was subsequently donated to the Saurer oldtimer club; the other remaining vehicles are privately owned.

Saurer F007: Simultaneously with the Saurer F006 the Saurer F007 was introduced in 1980 as a Pinzgauer High-Mobility All-Terrain Vehicle with similar versions available to the public. The F007 uses the same chassis and the same drive unit as the F006, however, unlike the F006 it does not have the cab behind the engine, but instead the engine compartment is internally located (as with many vans). It is therefore called a cab. Unlike the F006 the F007 has three windshield wiper blades instead of two, four headlights instead of two, and the front parking lights and turn signals are housed in the same headlamp shell. The gasoline tank filler neck is on the left side immediately behind the driver's door, and not as in the F006 on the right side between the rear and the rear wheel. The vehicle has a fixed cab which is open to the rear. The cargo area, passenger space is covered with a plastic sheet, including two plastic windows on each side. Again, this was based on the concept of the cab-over model 260 F by Monteverdi. For Swiss Army procurement, starting from 1982, SUV's in addition to dedicated military vehicles were prepared for testing. Here, too, the Swiss Army examined and appreciated the high-road tested prototypes of the F007, but did not buy the vehicle. The existing Saurer F007's are now privately owned.

Gallery of Saurer, Berna and NAW vehicles

See also
Rolls-Royce Crecy: Like the FLB 1000 aero engine, was a two-stroke Diesel converted to petrol with fuel injection.

Sources & References

 Biegger, Jürg. Swiss Post Buses in Transition 1906–2006. Uster: Transport Photo Archive. 
 Biegger Jürg. COE Coaches in Switzerland, 1936–1976. Uster: Transport Photo Archive. 
 Sahli, Kurt (2002). Saurer: Geschichte einer Nutzfahrzeugfabrik. 3rd ed. Bern: Verlag Stämpfli. 
 Vehicles of the Swiss Army (book).
 "Oerlikon". Google Finance.
 
 Federal Registry of Commerce Switzerland, Canton of Schwyz.

External links

 Saurer Club
 Oldtimer Club Saurer
 600+ Saurer and 100+ Berna trucks pictures
 "Passion Saurer", French forum on Saurer, Berna and FBW vehicles
 www.hptrans.ch
 www.schwyzer-poschti.de

Defence companies of Switzerland
Defunct bus manufacturers
Defunct truck manufacturers
Trolleybus manufacturers
Vehicle manufacturing companies established in 1902
Vehicle manufacturing companies disestablished in 1982
Defunct companies of Switzerland
Swiss brands
People from Arbon
Bus manufacturers of Switzerland
Truck manufacturers of Switzerland
Electric vehicle manufacturers of Switzerland
Textile machinery manufacturers